Slave to the Machine is this first full-length album by American rock band Lynam released on a major label.  Released in 2006, this album peaked at #21 on Billboard's Top Independent Albums chart and #19 on its Top Heatseekers chart.  Several of the tracks on this album can also be found on Lynam's earlier releases.  "Losing Venus" and "Never Fade Away" were both on Bling! Bling! while "Tanis," "Letting Go," and "By Your Side" also appeared on Life in Reverse.

Track listing
It's All In Your Head
Better
Tanis (Change Your Mind)
Slave to the Machine
Losing Venus
By Your Side
What Is This?
Sister Babylon
Giving Up On Rock 'N' Roll
Letting Go
Never Fade Away
I Hate My Generation

2006 albums
Lynam (band) albums